VI or Vi may refer to:

Arts, entertainment and media

Characters
Vi (League of Legends), a character from the League of Legends video game franchise
Vi (Buffy the Vampire Slayer), a minor character in the American TV series Buffy the Vampire Slayer
Vi, Violet Parr's nickname, a character of Walt Disney Pictures animated film The Incredibles
Vi Praskins, a major character in the 1950s American TV series Private Secretary

Music
Submediant chord, symbolized "VI" or "vi"
VI (Circle Jerks album), 1987
VI (The Danse Society album), 2015
VI (Onslaught album), 2013
VI (You Me at Six album), 2018
Ice-T VI: Return of the Real, an album by Ice-T, 1996
VI Music, a Puerto Rican record label

Magazines
Voetbal International, a prominent Dutch football (soccer) magazine
Vi (magazine), a Swedish lifestyle magazine

Businesses and organizations
Vi Senior Living, a provider of retirement communities in the United States
Victoria Institution, a secondary school in Kuala Lumpur, Malaysia
The Vinyl Institute, a U.S. industry trade group
Volga-Dnepr (IATA airline code VI), an airline based in Ulyanovsk, Russia
Vodafone Idea, branded as "Vi", a telecom operator based in India

People
Violet (given name), sometimes shortened to Vi
Vi Gale (1917–2007), Swedish-born American poet and publisher
Vi Hart (born 1988), "recreational mathemusician" known for creating mathematical YouTube videos
Vi Jordan (1913–1982), Australian politician, second woman elected to the Queensland Legislative Assembly
a nickname of Mary Ruth Ray (1956–2013), American classical musician
Seungri or V.I. (born 1990), member of South Korean pop band Big Bang
 Victoria Imperatrix (Latin for: "Victoria the Empress"), referring to Queen Victoria

Places
Vi, Sweden
Vi, a village in Shkodër County, Albania
Victoria Island, Lagos, an area of Lagos, Nigeria

Science and technology
.vi, the country code top level domain (ccTLD) for the United States Virgin Islands
vi, a screen-oriented text editor software application
Vapor intrusion, a process by which chemicals in soil or groundwater migrate to indoor air above a contaminated site
Vinyl group, a chemical group with the formula H-C=CH2
Virtual instrument (disambiguation), a program that implements functions of an instrument by computer, sensors and actuators
Viscosity index, a measure of how viscosity of a liquid changes with temperature
Vulnerability index, a measure of the exposure of a population to some hazard
Vi, an artificial intelligence personal trainer developed by LifeBEAM
Vi, from virginium, a rejected proposed name and abbreviation for the element francium

Codes
VI, FIPS country code for the British Virgin Islands, a British territory in the Caribbean
VI, United States Postal Service, United States Coast Guard, American National Standards Institute, ISO 3166 and WMO codes for the United States Virgin Islands, an American territory in the Caribbean
vi, ISO 639-1 code for the Vietnamese language, the national language of Vietnam

Other uses
VI, 6 (number) in Roman numerals
vide infra, Latin for "see below"
Visual impairment

See also
V1 (disambiguation) (number "1" as opposed to letter "i")

Hypocorisms